Patricia "Pat" Gerard is a Democratic politician and the first female mayor for the city of Largo, Florida. Gerard was born in Paterson, New Jersey. She is married and has one child, writer Sarah Gerard.

She earned a Bachelor of Arts degree in Psychology and a  Master of Arts in Rehabilitation Counseling from the University of South Florida. Gerard was a mental health worker in a community-based rehabilitation program after graduating from USF. From 1984 to 1986 she worked as Victim's Advocate for the Largo Police Department. From 1986 to 1992 she worked as director of the Spouse Abuse Shelter of Religious Community Services, where she stayed until 1992. After that, she worked for Family Resources, Inc. as Executive Director of Helpline. She is currently their COO.

She has served on numerous boards, including Suncoast Tiger Bay Board, the Business and Professional Women of St. Petersburg, Leadership Pinellas, Pinellas County Homeless Leadership Board, the United Way Council, Pinellas County Victim Rights Coalition, Pinellas County Domestic Violence Task Force, Florida Coalition Against Domestic Violence, Governor's Coordinating Council on Victim's Rights, and the Florida Alliance of Information and Referral Services Board.

Gerard also represents Largo on the Metropolitan Planning Organization, Pinellas Mobility Initiative, Pinellas Planning Council, Health and Human Services Coordinating Council Administrative Forum, Florida League of Cities, and Pinellas Emergency Medical Services Advisory Board.

She was elected to the City Commission in 2000 and again in 2003. She became mayor by defeating her predecessor, Robert E. Jackson, in 2006 in a bitterly contested race.

Gerard and Commissioner Rodney Woods were the two dissenting votes when the Largo City Commission voted to terminate City  Manager Stanton following her announcement of her decision to undergo sex reassignment surgery. In a CNN interview, Gerard explained her position of support for Stanton saying, "We're making a decision here about whether we're going to be an inclusive and compassionate community or are we going to be small-minded and bigoted."

In October, 2013, Gerard announced she was running for the Pinellas County Commission District 2 seat.

References

Women mayors of places in Florida
Living people
People from Largo, Florida
Politicians from Paterson, New Jersey
Year of birth missing (living people)
Mayors of places in Florida
21st-century American women
University of South Florida alumni